Schnelldorf station is a railway station in the municipality of Schnelldorf, located in the Ansbach district in Middle Franconia, Germany.

References

Railway stations in Bavaria
Railway stations in Germany opened in 1875
1875 establishments in Bavaria
Buildings and structures in Ansbach (district)